Thomas Chew Hopkins (1808 – October 12, 1876) was an American politician and physician from Maryland. He served as a member of the Maryland House of Delegates, representing Harford County from 1842 to 1843 and from 1865 to 1866.

Early life
Thomas Chew Hopkins was born in 1808 near Darlington, Maryland. He studied medicine under Dr. Robert Allen of Cecil County. Hopkins graduated as a member of the 1829–30 class of the University of Maryland School of Medicine with a Doctor of Medicine.

Career
Hopkins practiced medicine in Cecil County for about a year and then moved his practice to Harford County, and practiced in Havre de Grace for most of the remainder of his life. He was a member of the Medical Society of Harford County.

Hopkins served as a member of the Maryland House of Delegates, representing Harford County from 1842 to 1843 and from 1865 to 1866.

Hopkins helped organize the Havre de Grace Bank in 1841. Hopkins was a member of the Harford County school board in 1868.

Personal life
Hopkins married Priscilla Worthington in 1834 and had children, including D. W., Ellen and J. T. C. Hopkins. His grandson was Thomas C. Hopkins, who also served in the Maryland House of Delegates.

Hopkins died of typhoid fever on October 12, 1876, at his home in Havre de Grace.

References

1808 births
1876 deaths
People from Havre de Grace, Maryland
University of Maryland School of Medicine alumni
Members of the Maryland House of Delegates
Physicians from Maryland
19th-century American physicians
19th-century American politicians
Deaths from typhoid fever